The African section of the 1962 FIFA World Cup qualification saw six teams enter but only four compete for a partial spot at the final tournament.

Format
The format consisted of two rounds:
First Round: The 6 teams were divided into 3 groups of 2 teams each. The teams played against each other on a home-and-away basis. The group winners would advance to the Final Round.
Second Round: The 3 teams played against each other on a home-and-away basis. The group winner would advance to the UEFA/CAF Intercontinental Play-off.

First round

Group 1
 and the  both withdrew; the Group was scratched.

Group 2

Play-off

Group 3

Second round

Inter-confederation play-offs

Goalscorers

References

External links
 FIFA World Cup Official Site – 1962 World Cup Qualification
 RSSSF – 1962 World Cup Qualification

FIFA World Cup qualification (CAF)
CAF
1960 in African football
1961 in African football